Zaratha crotolitha is a moth of the family Agonoxenidae. It is found in Australia.

References

Moths described in 1915
Zaratha
Moths of Australia